Kiyokazu Nishikawa (born 10 November 1972) is a Japanese archer. He competed in the men's individual and team events at the 1992 Summer Olympics.

References

1972 births
Living people
Japanese male archers
Olympic archers of Japan
Archers at the 1992 Summer Olympics
Sportspeople from Fukuoka Prefecture